Chen Yinke, or Chen Yinque (3 July 18907 October 1969), was a Chinese historian, linguist, orientalist, politician, and writer. He was a fellow of Academia Sinica, considered one of the most original and creative historians in 20th century China. His representative works are Draft essays on the origins of Sui and Tang institutions, Draft outline of Tang political history, and An Alternative Biography of Liu Rushi.

Chen, together with Lü Simian, Chen Yuan and Ch'ien Mu, was known as the "Four Greatest Historians" of Modern China (現代四大史學家). Chen knew many languages; he was well-versed in Sanskrit and Pali, and had an understanding of various other languages including Mongolian, Manchu, Persian, English, French, German, Latin, Greek, and Japanese.

Biography

Early life
Chen Yinke was born in Changsha, Hunan in 1890, and his ancestral home was Yining, Jiangxi (now Xiushui County, Jiujiang). Yinke's father Chen Sanli was a famous poet, one of the "Four Gentlemen"  of the Hundred Days' Reform. His grandfather was Chen Baozhen, the governor of Hunan between 1895 and 1898.

His family had a distinguished tradition in classical learning, so he was exposed from an early age to the Chinese classics, to history, and to philosophy. In 1905 he was forced to return to China due to beriberi, and studied at Fudan Public School, Shanghai.

In 1910 he obtained a scholarship to study at Berlin University, and later at the University of Zurich and Institut d'Etudes Politiques de Paris. In 1914 he came back to China due to World War I.

In winter 1918 he got another official scholarship from Jiangxi to study abroad again. He studied Sanskrit and Pali at Harvard University under Charles Rockwell Lanman. At Harvard he first met Wu Mi, who was then studying literature under Irving Babbitt. They became lifelong friends.

In 1921, he went to Berlin University to study oriental languages under Heinrich Lüders, Central Asian languages under Max Müller, and Mongolian under Erich Haenisch. He acquired a knowledge of Mongolian, Tibetan, Manchu, Japanese, Sanskrit, Pali, English, French, German, Persian, Turkic, Tangut, Latin, and Greek. Particularly notable was his mastery of Sanskrit and Pali. Xia Zengyou once said to him: "It is good for you to be able to read books in foreign languages. I know only Chinese so I have no more to read after finishing all the Chinese books."

Tsinghua period
In March 1925, he returned to China again, meanwhile Wu Mi was in charge of the Institute of Guoxue Studies, Tsinghua School. He accepted the invitation to become a supervisor at Institute of Guoxue Studies, together with Wang Guowei, Liang Qichao and Zhao Yuanren. In 1928 Tsinghua School was restructured to become Tsinghua University. Chen was employed as professor at Chinese Language and Literature Department and History Department, while also adjunct with Peking University. Chen married Tang Yun (唐筼), granddaughter of Tang Jingsong, former governor of Republic of Formosa, in summer 1928. During this time he mainly gave lectures on Buddhist texts translation, historical documents of Jin Dynasty, Southern and Northern Dynasties, Sui Dynasty, Tang Dynasty, and Mongolia. Among the many students at this time who went on to scholarly careers were Zhou Yiliang and Yang Lien-sheng.

After the Second Sino-Japanese War began, Chen moved to National Southwestern Associated University, Kunming, Yunnan, teaching lectures on history of Jin Dynasty, Southern and Northern Dynasties, history of Sui Dynasty and Tang Dynasty, and poetry of Yuan Zhen and Bai Juyi.

During World War II
In 1939, Oxford University offered him a professorship in Chinese History. He left for Hong Kong in September 1940 on his way to United Kingdom, but was forced to return Kunming due to ongoing battles. In 1941 he became a guest professor with Hong Kong University to teach history of Sui Dynasty and Tang Dynasty. Since the Japanese occupation in Hong Kong began in the end of 1941, he conducted history research at home, which resulted in the writing of A Brief Introduction to the Political History of Tang Dynasty. In July 1942, Chen fled to Guilin to teach in Guangxi University, later in December 1943 he moved to Chengdu to teach in Yenching University. He became employed by Tsinghua University for a second time in 1946.

At Lingnan University
He began to teach at Lingnan University, Guangzhou in late 1948. As a result of a nationwide restructure campaign across universities and colleges, Lingnan University was merged into Zhongshan University in 1952. Chen Yinke taught courses on history of Jin Dynasty and Southern and Northern Dynasties, history of Tang Dynasty, and yuefu of Tang Dynasty. In 1953 he started writing Biography of Liu Rushi, an in-depth investigation of the poetry and activities of Liu Rushi, a famous prostitute in late Ming Dynasty and early Qing Dynasty. He finished this last major work in 1964, by then having become completely blind. He became vice president of Central Research Institute of Culture and History in July 1960.

During Cultural Revolution

Chen was persecuted during the Cultural Revolution due to his previous connection with the out-of-favor Tao Zhu. He and his wife's salaries were frozen by the Red Guards. Several times he was forced to write statements to clarify his political standings: "I have never done anything harmful to Chinese people in my life. I have been a teacher for 40 years, only doing teaching and writing, but nothing practical (for Kuomintang)". Many of his book collections and manuscripts were stolen.

He died in Guangzhou on 7 October 1969 for heart failure and sudden bowel obstruction. 11 days later his obituary was published by the Southern Daily. The bone ashes of Chen and his wife was at first stored at Yinhe Revolutionary Cemetery, but moved to Mountain Lu Botanical Garden in 2003. They are now buried near the "Tomb of the Three Elders"(Hu Xiansu, Ren-Chang Ching and Chen Fenghuai).

Research ideology

In the 1920s, Chen Yinke insisted that research should be of "thoughts of freedom, spirits of independence". In 1953 he was designated as head of the Second Department of Institute of History Study in Chinese Academy of Sciences. He demanded two requests to be granted, in his "Reply to the Chinese Academy of Sciences" on 1 December. The first one was "the Institute of Mid-Ancient Chinese History be exempt from the doctrines of Marxism, as well as attending politics lectures"; The second one was "a letter of approval from Mao Zedong or Liu Shaoqi, as a shield". He explained that "Mao, the top political authority, and Liu, the top party leader, should have consensus with me on the matter, otherwise academic research would be out of the question." He did not assume the position eventually, continuing working at Zhongshan University. The incident was not disclosed to the public until the 1980s.

List of works
《寒柳堂集》
《金明館叢稿初編》(Writings on Jin Ming Guan, Vol. 1)
《金明館叢稿二編》(Writings on Jin Ming Guan, Vol. 2)
《陈寅恪魏晋南北朝史讲演录》、萬繩楠整理，黃山書社1987年版 (Chen Yinke Lectures on History of Wei, Jin, Southern and Northern Dynasties),
《隋唐制度淵源略論稿》(A Brief Introduction to the Origins of Institutions of Sui and Tang Dynasties)
 《唐代政治史述論稿》(A Brief Introduction to the Political History of Tang Dynasty)
 《元白詩箋證稿》(On Yuan Zhen and Bai Juyi's Poems), referring to the poets Yuan Zhen and Bai Juyi, famous in Chinese history
 《柳如是別傳》(A Supplementary Biography of Liu Rushi)
 《詩集 附唐篔詩存》
 《書信集》
 《讀書札記一集》
 《讀書札記二集》
 《讀書札記三集》
 《講義及雜稿》
 《陳寅恪史學論文選集》，上海古籍出版社1992年版，收文五十二篇。
 《陳寅恪先生全集》，里仁書局1979年，收文九十四篇。(Chen Yinke Xiansheng Quanji, Chen Yinke's Entire Collection)
《论再生缘》Lun Zaishengyuan (On Reincarnation)
《陈寅恪学术文化随笔》Chen Yinke Xueshu Wenhua Suibi (Essays on Chen Yinke's Academy and Culture)
《陈寅恪文集》Chen Yinke Wenji (Collection of Chen Yin Ke)
《陈寅恪集》Chen Yinke Ji (Corpus of Chen Yin Ke)

Notes

References
Wu Mi and Chen Yinke, by Wu Xuezhao, Tsinghua University Press, 
On Memories of Chen Yinke, by Zhang Jie and Yang Yanli, Social Science Academy Press, 
Analysis of Chen Yinke, by Zhang Jie and Yang Yanli, Social Science Academy Press, 
Chronicles of Chen Yinke (revised), by Jiang Tianshu, Shanghai Ancient Book Press, 1997
The Last 20 Years of Chen Yinke, by Lu Jiandong, 陆键东，《陈寅恪的最后二十年》，Linking Press, 1997
Who Wanted to Come to Taiwan? By Li Ao
On Chen Yinke, By Yu Dawei et al.
Explanation and Argumentations of Late Chen Yinke's Writings, by Yu Yingshi, 1998
Four Sirs in Late Qing Dynasty, by Gao Yang, Crown Press 1983
The Family History of Chen Yinke, by Zhang Qiu Hui, Guangdong Education Press, 2000

Further Reading (Chinese) 

 Chen Xiaocong 陈小从. 图说义宁陈氏. 山东画报出版社. 2004. .
 Wang Zhenbang 王震邦. 獨立與自由：陳寅恪論學. 聯經出版. 2011. .
 Zhang Qiuhui 张求会. 陈寅恪的家族史. 广东教育出版社. 2007. .
 汪荣祖. 史家陈寅恪传. 北京大学出版社. 2005. .
 蔣天樞. 陳寅恪先生編年事輯. 上海古籍出版社. 1997. .
 陆键东. 陈寅恪的最后20年. 生活·读书·新知三联书店. 1995. .
 张杰, 杨燕丽. 追忆陈寅恪. 社会科学文献出版社. 1999. .
 张杰, 杨燕丽. 解析陈寅恪. 社会科学文献出版社. 1999. .
 劉克敵. 陳寅恪和他的同時代人. 時英出版社. 2007. .
 岳南. 陈寅恪与傅斯年. 陕西师范大学出版社. 2008. .
 吴学昭. 吴宓与陈寅恪. 清华大学出版社. 1992. .
 余英時. 陳寅恪晚年詩文釋證(二版). 東大圖書公司. 2011. .
 纪念陈寅恪先生诞辰百年学术论文集. 北京大学出版社. 1989. .
 罗志田. 陈寅恪的"不古不今之学". 近代史研究. 2008, (6).
 項念東. 錢穆論陳寅恪：一場並未公開的學術論爭. 博覽群書. 2008, (3).
 俞大維等. 談陳寅恪. 傳記文學.
 李敖，《誰要來台灣？》，收在《笑傲五十年》
 羅香林，《回憶陳寅恪師》
 Chen Zhesan 陳哲三：《陳寅恪軼事》
 罗志田：〈陈寅恪学术表述臆解〉。
 羅志田：〈從歷史記憶看陳寅恪與乾嘉考據的關係〉。
 陸揚：〈陈寅恪的文史之学——从1932年清华大学国文入学试题谈起〉。
 王晴佳：〈陈寅恪、傅斯年之关系及其他——以台湾中研院所见档案为中心〉。
 陳建華：〈从"以诗证史"到"以史证诗"——读陈寅恪《柳如是别传》札记〉。
 程美宝：〈陈寅恪与牛津大学〉。
 Chen Huaiyu 陈怀宇：〈陈寅恪《吾国学术之现状及清华之职责》疏证〉。
 陈怀宇：〈陈寅恪留学哈佛史事钩沉及其相关问题〉。
 陈怀宇：〈陈寅恪与赫尔德——以了解之同情为中心〉。
 沈亞明：〈陳寅恪書信時序索引（初稿）〉。

Portrait 
    Chen Yinke. A Portrait by Kong Kai Ming at Portrait Gallery of Chinese Writers (Hong Kong Baptist University Library).

External links
A Brief Biography of Chen Yinke
Chen Yinke: Professor of Professors
Guoxue Master in the 20th Century: Chen Yinque
The Two Scholars Who Haunt Tsinghua University (essay on Wang Guowei and Chen Yinque)

1890 births
1969 deaths
20th-century Chinese historians
Chinese blind people
Chinese orientalists
Chinese Indologists
Educators from Hunan
Corresponding Fellows of the British Academy
Fudan University alumni
Academic staff of Guangxi University
Harvard University alumni
Historians from Hunan
Academic staff of Lingnan University (Guangzhou)
Linguists from China
Members of Academia Sinica
Members of the National Committee of the Chinese People's Political Consultative Conference
Academic staff of the National Southwestern Associated University
Republic of China historians
People's Republic of China historians
People's Republic of China politicians from Hunan
Politicians from Changsha
Scientists from Hunan
Academic staff of Sun Yat-sen University
Academic staff of Tsinghua University
Victims of the Cultural Revolution
Writers from Changsha
Academic staff of Yenching University
20th-century linguists
Scientists with disabilities
Blind academics